Eois mediostrigata is a moth in the  family Geometridae. It is found in Peru and Ecuador.

The wingspan is about 22 mm. The forewings are grey, freckled with reddish brown. The lines are thick, reddish brown. There are  four lines on the hindwings. All are parallel and bluntly angled outwards, the first on the median vein, the other three between veins three and four.

References

Moths described in 1907
Taxa named by William Warren (entomologist)
Eois
Moths of South America